The South Kerry Greenway is a proposed greenway rail trail in County Kerry, Ireland. It is an off-road trail intended for use by cyclists and walkers along some of the route of the Farranfore–Valentia Harbour line, which opened 1893 and closed in 1960. The line was operated by the Great Southern and Western Railway.

In July 2021, legal challenges against the greenway planning permissions and associated compulsory purchase orders, as well as environmental impacts, were dismissed. It was announced that leave to appeal applications and further challenges would be assessed in November 2021. On 15 October 2021, it was reported that planning permission to construct the greenway was upheld. By December 2021, Supreme Court proceedings had been initiated. On 8 February 2022, the Supreme Court rejected the applications seeking leave for appeal, and Kerry County Council announced that it could "now proceed with the construction of the greenway".

References 

Long-distance trails in the Republic of Ireland
Geography of County Kerry
Tourist attractions in County Kerry
Rail trails in the Republic of Ireland
Irish Greenways